Godfrey Bolles Lee (19 March 1817 – 29 January 1903) was an English amateur cricketer who played first-class cricket from 1837 to 1845.

Mainly associated with Oxford University and Hampshire, he made 8 known appearances in first-class matches.

Lee spent most of his life at Winchester College, where he was educated. He was a tutor at Winchester from his graduation from New College, Oxford, in 1839 through to 1860, then bursar at New College for a year. He was a fellow of New College 1835–61. He then returned to Winchester as Warden from 1861 until his death in 1903. He was ordained as a Church of England priest in 1846.

References

1817 births
1903 deaths
English cricketers
English cricketers of 1826 to 1863
Oxford University cricketers
Hampshire cricketers
Oxford and Cambridge Universities cricketers
People educated at Winchester College
Alumni of New College, Oxford
Fellows of New College, Oxford
19th-century English Anglican priests
Wardens of Winchester College